Laila Kveli (born 22 October 1987, in Trondheim, Norway) is a Norwegian cross-country skier. She finished second in the women's main competition of Vasaloppet in 2012, and won the same competition in 2013 and 2014.

Merits

2012 
2nd place, Vasaloppet

2013 
1st place, Vasaloppet

2nd place, Marcialonga

3rd place, König-Ludwig-Lauf

2014 
1st place, Vasaloppet

2015 
1st place, Tjejvasan

References

External links
FIS

1987 births
Living people
Norwegian female cross-country skiers
Vasaloppet winners
Sportspeople from Trondheim